Varsity Blues is a 2002 EP by American rapper Murs. It is built around the theme of blues. It has the intention of helping teenagers through hard times, mainly African American high school students.

A sequel titled Varsity Blues 2 was released in 2011.

Track listing

References

External links
 

2002 EPs
Murs (rapper) albums